Didier Kiki (born 30 November 1995 in Porto-Novo) is a Beninese Olympic sprinter. 

He competed at the 2016 Summer Olympics in the men's 200 metres race; his time of 22.27 seconds in the heats did not qualify him for the semifinals.

He competed in the preliminary heats in the Athletics at the 2020 Summer Olympics – Men's 100 metres in Tokyo, running a personal best of 10.69 seconds.

References

1995 births
Living people
Beninese male sprinters
Olympic athletes of Benin
Athletes (track and field) at the 2016 Summer Olympics
Athletes (track and field) at the 2020 Summer Olympics
Olympic male sprinters

People from Porto-Novo